Cardiophorus is a genus of click beetles.

Selected species 
 Cardiophorus asellus Erichson, 1840
 Cardiophorus carduelis
 Cardiophorus collaris Erichson, 1840
 Cardiophorus elegans Candèze, 1878
 Cardiophorus gramineus (Scopoli, 1763)
 Cardiophorus ruficollis (Linnaeus, 1758)
 Cardiophorus vestigialis

References 

 Akhter, Drumont, Rizvi & Ahmed, 2011: Notes on species of Cardiophorinae (Candeze, 1860) from Pakistan with description of a new species (Coleoptera: Elateridae) and new records. Pakistan journal of zoology, 43(3): 477–481.
 Douglas, H. 2003: Revision of Cardiophorus (Coleoptera: Elateridae) species of eastern Canada and United States of America. Canadian entomologist, 135: 493–548, 
 Hawkeswood, T.J.; Makhan, D.; Turner, J.R. 2009: Cardiophorus jacquelinae sp. nov., a new click beetle (Coleoptera: Elateridae, Cardiophorinae) from Madagascan copal amber. Giornale italiano di entomologia, 12: 189-197
 Giuseppe Platia. 2012. Contribution to the knowledge of the click-beetles from the Socotra Island (Yemen) (Coleoptera Elateridae). Arquivos Entomolóxicos, 7: 129-153
 Platia, G. 2013b: New species, new records and notes on click- beetles from Greece (Coleoptera: Elateridae). Boletín de la Sociedad Entomológica Aragonesa, (52): 97–104

External links 
 
 
 

Elateridae genera